Miguel Maria N'Zau Puna has served as the ambassador of Angola to Canada from September 28, 2000 to 2008.

He served as Secretary-General of UNITA, an anti-Communist rebel group that fought against the MPLA during the Angolan Civil War from 1966 until right before the 1992 presidential election.

References

Angolan diplomats
Living people
Year of birth missing (living people)
UNITA politicians
Ambassadors of Angola to Canada
20th-century Angolan people
21st-century Angolan people